HMS Maori was one of five ships of the third batch of  destroyers built for the Royal Navy in the first decade of the twentieth century. Completed in 1909, she spent her career in British waters. During the First World War, she served in the North Sea and the English Channel with the 6th Destroyer Flotilla. She struck a mine in the North Sea on 7 May 1915 off Zeebrugge, Belgium, and sank.

Description
Ordered as part of the 1907–1908 Naval Programme, the third batch of Tribal-class destroyers were improved versions of the earlier-batch ships. The ship was powered by a single steam turbine set which drove three propeller shafts using steam provided by six Yarrow boilers. Their crew numbered 71 officers and ratings.

The ships were armed with a pair of BL  Mk VIII gun in single mounts, one on the forecastle and the other on the stern. Their torpedo armament consisted of two rotating torpedo tubes for 18-inch (450 mm) torpedoes, one mount between the two forward funnels and the other on the stern.

Construction and career
Maori was laid down by William Denny and Brothers at its Greenock shipyard on 6 August 1908, launched on 24 May 1909 and completed in November. On commissioning, Maori joined the 1st Destroyer Flotilla, based at Harwich, replacing the River-class destroyer . By March 1913, Maori was part of the 4th Destroyer Flotilla of the First Fleet.

Notes

Bibliography

External links
HMS Maori - Index of 19th Century Naval Vessels

 

Tribal-class destroyers (1905)
Ships built on the River Clyde
1909 ships
World War I destroyers of the United Kingdom
World War I shipwrecks in the North Sea
Maritime incidents in 1915
Ships sunk by mines